Mondpalast  is a theatre in Herne, North Rhine-Westphalia, Germany.

Theatres in North Rhine-Westphalia
Buildings and structures in Herne, North Rhine-Westphalia